Major Abraham Staats or Abram Staes (Amsterdam January 19, 1620 (baptized)– New York ca. 1694) was one of the first settlers of the New Netherland colonies and is the founder of the Staats family in New Amsterdam and the early American colonies.

Early life
Staats was born in Holland around 1618 and his parents were Isaac Staats (b. ca. 1586) and Sara Lauwers (1588–1641), originally from Antwerp.

New Amsterdam
In 1642, he emigrated to Beverwijck (now known as Albany).  Staats and his wife, Trijntje, traveled to New York on board of the Houttuijn.  He was employed as a surgeon in the New Netherland by the Van Rensselaer family.

Personal life
On January 26, 1642, Staats married, in Amsterdam, to Trijntje "Catharina" Jochems (1621–1703), daughter of captain Jochem Gijsen and Trijntje Gerrits.  Together, they were the parents of:

 Jochem Staats (1654–1712)
 Dr. Samuel Staats (1657–1715)
 Elizabeth Staats (1659–1737), who married Johannes Wendell (1649–1692), and after his death, Johannes Schuyler (1668–1747)
 Abraham Peter Staats (b. 1665), who married Elsje Wendell
 Jacob Staats (b. ca. 1665)

Honors
His name is given to some early place names in the Hudson Valley, such as Staats Island, Staats Point (on the Hudson), and Abram Staats Kill (Creek). The Staats House, which he built, is currently the oldest home in Columbia County.

References

1620 births
1694 deaths
Dutch surgeons
People of New Netherland
Physicians from Amsterdam
17th-century Dutch physicians